Charles Pernell "Lefty" Boone (March 24, 1920 – September 18, 1976), also nicknamed "Zoot Suit", was an American baseball pitcher in the Negro leagues. He played with several teams from 1940 to 1944.

References

External links
 and Seamheads  

Memphis Red Sox players
St. Louis–New Orleans Stars players
Harrisburg Stars players
New York Black Yankees players
Cleveland Buckeyes players
Jacksonville Red Caps players
Philadelphia Stars players
1920 births
1976 deaths
Baseball players from Illinois
Baseball pitchers
Sportspeople from East St. Louis, Illinois